Navy Children School (NCS) is a chain of schools across India administrated by The Navy Education Society. The school began as Naval School on 2 August 1965 with the first branch at Delhi, but changed its name to Naval Public School in 1985 and then Navy Children School in 2005.

The school is affiliated with the CBSE and has classes up to XII.

Branches
The school has these branches across India:
 Navy Children School, Delhi
 Navy Children School Pot Blair
 Navy Children School Arakonam
 Navy Children School Kawar
 Navy Children School Kochi
 Navy Children School Visakhapatnam
 Navy Children School Goa
 Navy Children School Landla
 Navy Children School Mumbai
 Navy Children School Karanjit
 Navy Children School Combatore
Navy Children School Porbander

References

External links 
 Navy Education Society 

Educational institutions established in 1965
Schools in Delhi
Indian Navy
1965 establishments in India